Comics Gaming Magazine, also called CGMagazine, is a print and digital gaming culture and media magazine based in Canada. Launched in 2010, the magazine covers a wide range of topics including gaming, movies, television, culture, technology, with features, interviews and reviews looking at all sides of the industry. The magazine is owned and published by the CGMagazine Publishing Group that also publishes a series of books under a few publishing imprints, including the works of Seymour Mayne, notable Canadian poet. CGMagazine is available in a print edition of the magazine that is available in Canada and the United States, with a website and digital editions that can be read worldwide.

History 
CGMagazine first broke into the publishing scene in 2010, with a special emphasis on digital and analog media, video gaming, and generalized media. Starting with a small monthly publication, CGMagazine has since grown into an online hub for information regarding the latest the technology and media sector has to offer; with both a bi-monthly physical publication, and a digital version that has appeared on many online platforms such as Flipster, Ebsco, and Magazines Canada. The magazine has hosted a range of writing talent from all sides of the gaming and media industry including Justin Amirkhani (Sometimes Always Monsters), Julia Alexander (Polygon, The Verge, IGN), Casey DeFreitas (IGN Wiki), and Andrew Webster (The Verge). It was started by a larger team, but Editor-in-Chief, Brendan Frye, has managed the editing duties along with appearing as the face of the magazine for many interviews, and features.

The magazine recently moved to the Niagara region from Toronto, but still works with writers from all over the world. CGMagazine often works with local artists for the covers on the print magazine, and has featured art from Richard Pace and Mike del Mundo among many other new and known artists and designers. In a recent move, it was detailed that CGMagazine is expanding their coverage of music and the people that work on audio in games, looking at people such as Tommy Tallarico and the studio Harmonix, along with singer Lights.

Content 
CGMagazine releases numerous articles weekly including interviews with media personalities such as David Hayter, David Jaffe, Ashly Burch, Brad William Henke, and Horror Icon Michael Berryman; features, reviews, and news. Their interviews and articles have been quoted by publications such as PCGamer, Game Informer, and IGN. The magazine has also been sourced for stories published in Global News, along with been quoted by The Washington Post,   and Vice. The editors and writers of the magazine are also seen on segments for The List, a syndicated show that focuses on practical information in an entertaining way, aimed at a wide range of demographics.

Their Podcast, the Pixels and Ink, was part of the BUNS podcast network, with it now appearing on Spotify, iTunes, and Sticher. The cast features the editors of the magazine discussing news and events of the week, and has featured industry guests to discuss projects and be part of the cast.

Features can be based on current events or social commentary, including anything from an in depth look at women in the gaming industry, to starter guides for those looking to dive into VR. They can also surround specific products, list specifications and discuss public opinion. Reviews, on the other hand, will always include a score by the individual reviewer, and reflect solely on that writer's experience and expertise. The news section of the site keeps its readers updated daily with all the key stories in digital media and pop culture. News articles are constantly followed when new developments occur, keeping its journalism fresh and CGMagazine readers informed. They are also notable for breaking the news about Versus Evil and the Afro Samurai 2 delisting, which was later picked up by many outlets, including Polygon and GameSpot among many others. CGMagazine covers all major trade shows, including E3, CES, Gamescom, MIGS, and GDC. The magazine has been included on juries for many Game Awards, including E3 Game Critic Awards, Best of Gamescom, etc.

Review process 
CGMagazine uses a 20-point rating system, with games scored in increments of 0.5. Under the system, no game can earn more than 10, or less than 1. The magazine outlines that the score will not change once it is awarded, although the text of the review may change when new features or updates are added, similarly to breaks in news stories. The magazine is also on Metacritic and OpenCritic. The review breakdown is outlined on their Review Policy page, and clearly states what every score means. CGMagazine has rewarded very few movies and games a 10/10, but some titles include Star Craft 2: Wings of Liberty, God of War (2018), and most recently Age Of Empires IV. When it comes to film and TV, few reviews ever break the 9.5/10 threshold, but some 2021's In The Heights did manage it, scoring a perfect 10/10.

CGMagazine is often included in review breakdowns from sites such as GameSpot, PCGamer, Game Informer and Forbes.

References 

Film magazines published in Canada
Video game magazines
Magazines established in 2010